Turbo (formerly Spoon and Xenocode) is a set of software products and services developed by the Code Systems Corporation for application virtualization, portable application creation, and digital distribution. Code Systems Corporation is an American corporation headquartered in Seattle, Washington, and is best known for its Turbo products that include Browser Sandbox, Turbo Studio, TurboServer, and Turbo.

Kenji Obata founded Code Systems Corporation in 2006 and introduced Turbo’s precursor, Xenocode. Xenocode was an early application virtualization engine for the Windows platform. Obata serves as the CEO of the corporation, which had become commonly known as Spoon since a rebranding in 2010.

Turbo’s tools package conventional software applications for Microsoft Windows in a portable application format that can be delivered via a single executable or streamed over the web. Files and settings automatically synchronize across devices via Turbo’s patented virtualization technology which allows access to local files and printers from web-based applications.

About the company
CEO Obata graduated from Yale University in 1999 with a Bachelor of Science in Computer Science and Mathematics (summa cum laude). He spent several years as a development lead at Microsoft Corporation before attending the University of California, Berkeley to obtain his Ph.D. in Computer Science. After receiving his Ph.D., Obata returned to Seattle in 2006 to grow the company.

From 2006 to 2009, the Code Systems Corporation developed Xenocode, one of the first application virtualization engines for the Windows platform. The product focused on application deployment via preconfigured executables.

Spoon was launched in 2010 as a reintroduction of Xenocode’s virtualization engines. Turbo’s technology combines application and storage virtualization with web-based network and synchronization protocols, machine learning algorithms, and semistructured large data storage systems. Turbo.net virtual applications run in isolated sandboxes, allowing multiple application versions to run simultaneously without conflict. Turbo.net uses technologies such as Scala, Akka, Lift, and AWS to build its website and server systems.

Turbo technology is used by educational, entertainment, financial, government, health care, and information technology organizations. Turbo’s customer base consists of tens of thousands of organizations and millions of end users.

Products include solutions for enterprise software distribution; web development and testing tools such as Browser Sandbox, Browser Studio, and Turbo; and free accounts that allow users to stream hundreds of brand-name applications like Skype, Chrome, and Firefox without installing them. All accounts also come with cloud storage hosted on Turbo.net.

Turbo is headquartered in Seattle, is profitable and employee-owned, and adds thousands of new users each week.

Turbo.net 

Turbo.net, the official website of Turbo, hosts applications that can be launched via the web with no installation. Turbo’s application library includes popular software like Chrome, Skype, VLC Media Player, SketchUp, and hundreds of other top free and open-source applications. Turbo works through a small browser plugin with no administrative privileges or drivers required.

In addition to functioning as a tool for individuals, Turbo is often used by professionals who work from multiple desktops, small businesses and teams requiring collaboration, and larger enterprises with distributed or remote workforces. The introduction of Turbo, which combines Selenium with Turbo browsers for unlimited automated browser testing, has increased Turbo’s utilization as a web development and testing tool.

Turbo works by materializing a virtual environment on the endpoint device, transferring application components required for execution, capturing application interactions with the storage system into a sandbox, and synchronizing the sandbox contents back to the cloud.

The Turbo Virtual Machine (SVM) is a lightweight implementation of core operating system APIs, including the filesystem, registry, process, and threading subsystems; it is completely implemented within the Windows user-mode space. Applications executing within the Turbo virtual environment interact with a virtualized filesystem, registry, and process environment, rather than directly with the host device operating system. The virtualization engine handles requests within the virtualized environment internally or, when appropriate, routes requests to the host device filesystem and registry, possibly redirecting or overriding requests as determined by the virtual application configuration.

Cross-browser testing - Browser Sandbox
Turbo.net hosts browsersandbox.com, which allows users to run multiple versions of browsers such as Internet Explorer, Google Chrome, Mozilla Firefox, Opera, and mobile browsers on a single machine. Web developers can use Browser Sandbox for cross-browser testing to ensure websites function correctly in multiple versions of popular browsers.

Virtualized browsers behave exactly like installed browsers, and because they run locally, web applications tests can be hosted on the user’s own development machine or on internal servers.

Turbo.net supports standard browser components like Java applets and ActiveX controls as well as popular browser plugins like Firebug, IE Developer Toolbar, and CSS and JavaScript debugging consoles.

App Library
Similar to their Browser Sandbox, Turbo hosts an extensive application library filled with hundreds of free and open-source applications that Turbo streams to end users. The app library is part of Turbo’s free basic account and lets anyone stream and use full desktop applications like Skype, Google Chrome, VLC media player, Sublime Text, Notepad++, and GIMP without installing them.

Turbo virtual applications do not need to be accessed through a browser. Users with Turbo’s plugin can press [Alt+Win] to bring up the Spoon Console, which acts as an alternate Start menu that can launch both local and virtualized applications and files.

Turbo claims that running these applications in virtual sandboxes is faster, safer, and more portable than installing them locally.

Software

Turbo Studio

Turbo Studio (formerly Spoon Studio and Xenocode Virtual Application Studio) is an application virtualization tool that runs on Microsoft Windows. The tool packages software applications into portable applications; these single executable files can be run instantly on any Windows computer. Turbo Studio emulates the operating system features that are necessary for applications to run and therefore reduces resource overhead. Turbo Studio allows the user to convert existing applications into virtual applications. Deployment models include standalone EXE, MSI package, and HTTP-based delivery via the Turbo browser plugin.

Turbo Studio packages all application files, settings, runtimes, and components into a single package that runs instantly with zero setup. The Turbo virtual machine (SVM) supports all versions of the .NET Framework and Java, thus allowing users to execute .NET, Java, and AIR-based applications with no separate installations. Turbo allows legacy software to run properly on new operating systems, thereby reducing the cost and risk associated with operating system rollouts.

Turbo is the only virtualization engine in its class to support virtualization of both 32- and 64-bit applications; system services and databases such as SQL Server; and advanced software technologies such as DCOM and SxS. Fully user-mode implementation eliminates the need for device drivers, reboots, and administrative privileges.

TurboServer

TurboServer (formerly Spoon Server) is an application deployment platform that allows software packaged with Turbo Studio to be deployed, patched, and managed via the web. End users log into a website from any browser and are able to launch and use desktop-level applications like Microsoft Word and Photoshop without having to install them. It is a private version of the Turbo.net service.

Applications are streamed to user desktops and run on clean desktops without administrative privileges. Desktops can be re-imaged and locked-down.

TurboServer includes additional administrative features such as AD/LDAP integration, user and group application access control, usage logging, and analytics.

Turbo 
Turbo (formerly Spoonium) is a platform of tools that allows users to package Windows desktop applications and their dependencies into software containers. Application containers made with Turbo can run on any Windows machine without installers, app breaks, or dependencies.

Containers can be used to streamline the software development life cycle. Developers can ensure that their applications run as intended by including specific dependencies within containers. Software testers can rapidly pull and test software without having to install dependencies, can test multiple application versions side-by-side, and can return application containers to their development teams in specific app states. System administrators can reduce failures due to differences in development, testing, production, and end-user environments.

Turbo’s service is currently in an open beta.

See also 
 VMware ThinApp
 Windows To Go

References

Virtualization software
Software companies based in Seattle
Windows-only software
Shareware
Software companies of the United States